Lady Audley's Secret is a 1915 American silent drama film directed by Marshall Farnum and starring Theda Bara, Riley Hatch and Clifford Bruce. It was an adaptation of the 1862 British novel Lady Audley's Secret by Mary Elizabeth Braddon. It is now considered a lost film. The film was less successful than Bara's other films of the period, because it did not feature her in the wildly popular vamp role she had established.

Cast
 Theda Bara as Helen Talboys  
 Riley Hatch as Luke Martin  
 Clifford Bruce as George Talboys  
 Stephen Grattan as Undetermined Role  
 Warner Richmond as Sir Michael Audley

References

Bibliography
 Goble, Alan. The Complete Index to Literary Sources in Film. Walter de Gruyter, 1999.
 Krefft, Vanda. The Man Who Made the Movies: The Meteoric Rise and Tragic Fall of William Fox. HarperCollins, 2017.

External links

1915 films
Silent American drama films
American silent feature films
1915 drama films
1910s English-language films
Films directed by Marshall Farnum
Fox Film films
Films based on British novels
Films set in London
Lost American films
1915 lost films
Lost drama films
1910s American films